Adam Joseph Exner (born December 24, 1928, Killaly, Saskatchewan) is a Canadian Catholic prelate and former archbishop of the Archdiocese of Vancouver from 1991 to 2004.

Training and early religious life
Adam Exner holds Master's degrees in philosophy and theology from the Pontifical Gregorian University in Rome and holds a Doctoral degree in theology from the University of Ottawa. He served as professor, rector and superior at St. Charles Scholasticate in Battleford, Saskatchewan, and as professor of moral theology at Newman Theological College in Edmonton, Alberta. He entered the religious institute of the Missionary Oblates of Mary Immaculate in 1950 in St. Norbert, Manitoba and was ordained as a priest in 1957. In 1974, Exner was appointed Bishop of Kamloops and in 1982, Archbishop of Winnipeg.

Archbishop of Vancouver
Adam Exner was appointed Archbishop of Vancouver on May 25, 1991. He served in that position until reaching the mandatory retirement for Archbishops in January 2004. That year, the Catholic Civil Rights League created the Archbishop Exner Award for Catholic Excellence in Public Life in honour of the occasion.  He resides at St. Peter's Abbey, Muenster, Saskatchewan.

Advocacy and activities
In 1995, Archbishop Exner secured from then-Premier Michael Harcourt, the Denominational Health Association, a legacy of his predecessor, Archbishop James Francis Carney. During his tenure, Exner objected to efforts by the Minister of Health, Colin Hansen, to close St. Mary's Hospital (Vancouver).

While Exner was Archbishop of Vancouver, civil litigation resulting from the Mount Cashel Orphanage sexual and physical abuse scandal threatened assets of the Congregation of Christian Brothers located in British Columbia. These included Vancouver College and St. Thomas More Collegiate, which faced closure and liquidation in order to pay the victims. Archbishop Exner was closely involved with the efforts to prevent the closure of those schools.

Archbishop Exner assisted Covenant House, a home for runaway street kids, in establishing a branch of its services into Vancouver. Under direction from Archbishop Exner, the Archdiocese of Vancouver sought and obtained intervenor status during litigation involving Trinity Western University relating to its training policies. The litigation involved a dispute between Trinity Western, a Christian university, and the British Columbia College of Teachers, which believed that TWU could not train teachers for public schools because it required students to abstain from homosexual relations. TWU won in the Court of Appeal and the Supreme Court.

In 2003, Exner directed four Catholic schools to divest from a school banking program operated by VanCity, in protest of the Archdiocese's position that VanCity was actively promoting homosexuality through its sponsorship of a homosexual film festival and by giving an award to a lesbian bookstore.

Honours
Archbishop Exner was appointed Knight Grand Cross of the Equestrian Order of the Holy Sepulchre as well as Grand Prior of the Lieutenancy of Canada.

Memberships
In his role as Archbishop, Exner became a member of the following:
 Sacred Congregation for Bishops
 Permanent Council of the Canadian Conference of Catholic Bishops, with which he was involved in the Theology and Christian Education Commissions and the National Catholic-Lutheran dialogue
 Member of the Social Communications Commission

See also
Robert Jacobson

References

External links
 Archdiocese of Vancouver former bishops

Living people
1928 births
Roman Catholic archbishops of Winnipeg
Roman Catholic archbishops of Vancouver
20th-century Roman Catholic bishops in Canada
21st-century Roman Catholic bishops in Canada
University of Ottawa alumni
Knights of the Holy Sepulchre
Roman Catholic bishops of Kamloops
Missionary Oblates of Mary Immaculate